Highway 340 (AR 340, Ark. 340, Hwy. 340, also Lancashire Boulevard) is an east–west state highway in Benton County, Arkansas. The route of  runs entirely across Bella Vista, from Arkansas Highway 279 in the west to Arkansas Highway 94 in the east.

Route description

The highway begins in west Bella Vista at Forest Hills Boulevard near the Northwest Arkansas Community College Bella Vista campus. AR 340 winds past numerous retirement communities and a few lakes on its way through the village. Approximately halfway along its length, AR 340 intersects US Route 71, which is a four-lane expressway. The interchange with US 71 is unusual, with long ramps on the northbound side and cramped southbound ramps.

On the other side of US 71, the highway runs near the Mildred B. Cooper Memorial Chapel, built by local architect E. Fay Jones (in similar style to the Thorncrown Chapel on the National Register of Historic Places).
Highway 340 continues to wind northeast past communities and cul-de-sacs before meeting Pickens Rd, which continues briefly before becoming Missouri supplemental route E.

History
The route was added to the state highway system on August 25, 1965. Described as the road from northeast of Hiwasse to the junction of Highway 94 at the Missouri state line, the routing has changed little since first designation.

Major intersections

See also

 List of state highways in Arkansas

References

External links

340
Transportation in Benton County, Arkansas